Ahmed Assiri (born December 3, 1988) is a Saudi football player who plays for Al-Entesar as a left-back.

References

1988 births
Living people
Saudi Arabian footballers
Al-Ansar FC (Medina) players
Al-Orobah FC players
Ettifaq FC players
Ohod Club players
Najran SC players
Al-Taqadom FC players
Al-Hejaz Club players
Al-Entesar Club players
Saudi First Division League players
Saudi Professional League players
Saudi Second Division players
Association football fullbacks